WiFi Master (formerly WiFi Master Key) is a peer-to-peer Wi-Fi sharing mobile application software for free Wi-Fi access developed by LinkSure Network.  It uses cloud computing, big data and principles of the sharing economy.
 The company's founder and CEO, Chen Danian, was previously CEO and co-founder of Shanda.

WiFi Master was first released in 2012, and by 2016 had become the world’s largest Wi-Fi sharing app, with over 900 million users and 520 million monthly active users.

In terms of combined iOS and Android app downloads, WiFi Master is ranked 5th in the world, after WhatsApp, Instagram, Facebook and Facebook Messenger. WiFi Master is the 3rd largest software app in China after WeChat and Tencent QQ.

History

WiFi Master was created by Chen Danian in hopes of 'bridging the digital divide and to help people achieve self-actualization by granting them access to free Internet'.

Chen Danian shared in an interview with Forbes that 'he was born into poverty in rural China, and using the Internet, he realized that it was a tool to change destinies and pursue happiness by exploring opportunities'.

In September 2012, WiFi Master was first launched in China.

In 2015, its operating company, LinkSure closed its A round funding of USD $52 million, and became a unicorn company in the mobile internet industry. In May 2015, LinkSure bought the domain name wifi.com and established a branch in Singapore to expand its overseas services. WiFi Master was launched worldwide, rapidly gaining popularity in Southeast Asia. 

In 2016, WiFi Master became the world’s largest WiFi sharing community, providing over 4 billion daily average connections with a successful connection rate of over 80% worldwide. WiFi Master is available in 223 countries, and is the top Tools app on the Google Play Store in 49 countries.

In 2019, WiFi Master Key rebranded as WiFi Master.

Features

WiFi Search
The application's core function, Wifi Search, allows for users to find and connect to available nearby Wi-Fi hotspots.

WiFi Security Matrix
WiFi Master introduced an all-round WiFi Security Matrix for heightened security during the connection.

Before connection
WiFi Master designed a Cloud Security Detection System (Chinese: 安全云感知系统) to help users detect possible Wi-Fi security risks in advance based on big data tracking. The system also applies machine learning algorithms in real-time to track predicted 'risky' Wi-Fi hotspots.

During connection
WiFi Master developed a Security Tunnel Protection System (Chinese: 安全隧道保护系统) to provide users with fundamental protection during each Wi-Fi connection. The system uses encrypted hierarchical transmission, malicious attack real-time monitoring, and attack interception to encrypt users’ information.

After connection
Since September 2015, WiFi Master’s users in China have been insured by WiFi Security Insurance (WiFi安全险), launched by LinkSure in partnership with ZhongAn Insurance, in the event of a network security issue.

Discover News Feed
WiFi Master features a news feed in the app for users to browse content upon getting connected online.

WiFi tools
In-built tools like WiFi speed tests and WiFi signal tests are also included in the app.

WiFi Map
In 2016, WiFi Master introduced a WiFi Map function in the app for users to find open hotspots.

Awards
WiFi Master won the “Product with the Most Growth” at the 2017 iResearch Awards in June 2017.

References

Wi-Fi
Android (operating system) software
IOS software
Cross-platform software